James Joseph Sweeney (September 1, 1929 – February 8, 2013) was an American football player and coach, the head coach at Montana State University (1963–1967), Washington State University (1968–1975), and California State University, Fresno (1976–1977, 1980–1996), compiling a career college football record of  Sweeney's 144 wins at Fresno State are the most in the program's history.

Early years
Born in Butte, Montana, Sweeney was the youngest of seven children of Will and Kate Sweeney; his father was a hard-rock miner who emigrated from Ireland. As a youth in Butte, he was a top pitcher and outfielder in baseball, and graduated from Butte Central Catholic High School in 1947.

Sweeney played college football as an end at the University of Portland in Oregon, and graduated in 1951. After his junior year, the school dropped football as an intercollegiate sport, and Sweeney spent his senior season of 1950 as a high school coach at Columbia High School in Portland.

Coaching career
Following graduation, Sweeney returned to Montana and was a high school assistant at his alma mater, Butte Central, for a season. He was its head coach from 1952 to 1955, then at Flathead High School in Kalispell from 1956 to 1959. Sweeney moved up to the college ranks in 1960 as an assistant coach at Montana State in Bozeman under Herb Agocs, and was promoted to head coach in 1963. He compiled a  record and three Big Sky Conference championships in his five seasons with the Bobcats, where one of his starting quarterbacks was Dennis Erickson. Sweeney's salary at MSU in 1967 was $15,000.

At Montana State, Sweeney is credited with convincing Jan Stenerud, a Norwegian on a ski jumping scholarship (three-time Big Sky champion), to go out for the football team as a kicker. Stenerud went on to become the only "pure" kicker inducted into the Pro Football Hall of Fame.

After his success in Bozeman, Sweeney moved up to the Pac-8 Conference at Washington State in Pullman, where he started with a one-year contract at $20,000 in 1968. He had only one winning season (1972) and compiled a  record in eight seasons. His team's most noteworthy accomplishment was the defeat of Rose Bowl-bound Stanford in 1971 to garner him NCAA District 8 Coach of the Year honors. One of his notable hires in Pullman was WSU alumnus Jack Elway, father of future hall of fame quarterback John Elway. After a disappointing conclusion to the 1975 season (winless in conference), Sweeney resigned at WSU a week after the season ended.

Promptly hired at Fresno State, Sweeney led the Bulldogs for two seasons before becoming a National Football League (NFL) assistant for two years. He spent the  season with the Oakland Raiders in John Madden's final   and the  season with the St. Louis Cardinals under Bud Wilkinson, who was fired before the season's end. Sweeney returned to Fresno State as head coach in December 1979 for 17 more seasons; he compiled a  record and eight conference championships (PCAA/Big West and WAC) in 19 seasons.  Sweeney retired from coaching following the 1996 season with 201 wins in 32 seasons. He was most proud of the 1977 team (9–2), and credited them as the "stadium builders", because their success got the local community motivated to fund and construct Bulldog Stadium, which opened in 1980.

Personal life
Sweeney was the father of nine children: Jim, Peggy, Sheila, Carol, Mary Lou (Dion), Daniel, Colline, Patty (Negrete), and Kevin Sweeney, whom he coached at Fresno State. His wife and mother of all his children, Lucille (Cile) Carollo Sweeney, was his high school sweetheart from Butte; she died at age 57 in 1988 from an intracranial hemorrhage. He later married June Sweeney and they resided in Fresno. Two of his grandsons played Pac-10 football: Nate Fellner at Washington and Kyle Negrete at  USC. Sweeney's grandson, Beau, played at California before transferring in 2011.

Sweeney died in Fresno in 2013 at age 83. He and his wife had recently moved to a senior living home due to his failing health, which included a stay at St. Agnes Medical Center.

Head coaching record

College

*Includes forfeit by Louisiana–Lafayette

See also
 List of college football coaches with 200 wins

References

1929 births
2013 deaths
American football ends
Fresno State Bulldogs football coaches
Montana State Bobcats football coaches
Oakland Raiders coaches
Portland Pilots football players
St. Louis Cardinals (football) coaches
Washington State Cougars football coaches
High school football coaches in Oregon
High school football coaches in Montana
Sportspeople from Butte, Montana
Coaches of American football from Montana
Players of American football from Montana
American people of Irish descent